Mark Reynan Mikesell Cardona (born November 13, 1981) is a Filipino professional basketball player for the Boracay Islanders of the Pilipinas Super League. From a successful college career with the De La Salle University (DLSU) Green Archers, Cardona was taken fifth overall by Air21 Express in the 2005 PBA draft.

Early life
Cardona was born on November 13, 1981, at Mandaluyong, Metro Manila to Reynaldo Cardona and Griselda. The youngest of five children, Cardona got his elementary education from various schools, which include NAMEI Polytechnic Institute, Jose Rizal College, Isaac Lopez Elementary School, and a public school in Cardona, Rizal.

Amateur career
He spent most of high school at Carson High School in the United States where he finished Level 10, which did not qualify him for a diploma. Cardona eventually came back home to the Philippines and took the DECS (now DepEd) Philippine Educational Placement Test (PEPT) to be eligible for admission to college. With the intent of using his basketball skills as a passport to a good college education, he walked in for a tryout with the De La Salle University Green Archers basketball team. He played for La Salle's UAAP championship team of 2001.

Despite several controversies and allegations, primarily regarding his residency and eligibility, Cardona went on to win the University Athletic Association of the Philippines Rookie of the Year award with the Green Archers in 2001. Cardona was also part of the UAAP 67th season Mythical Five and was named the Finals MVP for the same season.

Cardona played for ICTSI-La Salle in the Philippine Basketball League from 2002 to 2005, where he was awarded top rookie honors as PBL Top Newcomer. After ICTSI's departure from the league, Cardona joined Harbour Centre in the 2005 PBL Unity Cup, where he was named MVP of the conference.

During his stint at the amateur PBL, he was consistently named to the Mythical Team and also received recognition as the league's Scoring Sensation award.

Professional career

2005 PBA draft
In August 2005, Cardona was picked fifth overall by the Air21 Express during the 2005 PBA draft.

Talk 'N Text Tropang Texters (2005–2010)
Before the season started, he was eventually traded to the Talk 'N Text Tropang Texters franchise.

Despite a slow start in his rookie season, Cardona played significant minutes under Derrick Pumaren who replaced Joel Banal as the team's head coach.

In his sophomore year in the league, with a career-high of 38 points - resetting his previous 30+ career outputs three times within two weeks - Cardona proved to be every bit the explosive player that he is. To date, he is the only player to be named PBA Press Corps' Player of the Week seven times within one conference (2007 Fiesta Conference). As a confirmation of his explosiveness and a testament to his overall tenacity as a player, Cardona received the PBA Conference Best Player award for the 2007 Fiesta Conference. He was also an official nominee for the coveted Most Valuable Player award of the 2006-2007 season.

In November 2008, Cardona once again reset his career statistics by tallying 42 points together with 6 rebounds to propel Talk 'N Text Tropang Texters over the Red Bull Barako. Cardona claimed that the feat sent a clear message that he deserved to be part of the Philippine National Team. Although he wasn't chosen to be part of the line-up, National Team coach Yeng Guiao was quick to point out that Cardona was considered “even if he did not score 42 points as he did against our team (Red Bull)."

Cardona won his first (and only) championship as a professional basketball player via the 2008–09 PBA Philippine Cup on February 11, 2009. Although losing on votes to the Alaska Aces' star Willie Miller for the Best Player of the Conference trophy, Cardona was awarded the PBA Finals Most Valuable Player honors for his remarkable output during the championship series.

Meralco Bolts (2010–2013)
On August 20, 2010, Cardona was traded by Talk 'N Text to its sister team and expansion team Meralco Bolts in exchange of a first-round pick. Cardona played his first game for the Bolts on October 3, 2010, against the Baranggay Ginebra Kings. He recorded 12 points, 6 rebounds and 4 assists in 33 minutes of play, including the game-winning teardrop.

Air21 Express / NLEX Road Warriors (2013–2016)
On October 14, 2013, he was traded by the Bolts to Air21 Express in a complex three-team trade that also involved Cardona's former team Talk 'N Text. In Air21, he was reunited with his former college coach at La Salle, Franz Pumaren and other former college teammates.

Personal life

On August 21, 2016, Cardona was rushed to the hospital following a drug overdose in an apparent suicide attempt. He was confined at the intensive care unit (ICU) of the University of Perpetual Help Hospital in Las Piñas after his vital signs stabilized.

With his relationship with live-in partner Bianca reportedly on the rocks, he allegedly took a huge amount of prescription pills which he even posted on his Instagram account, which was later deleted. He was also placed in the injured reserved list by the team after injuring himself in an accident while riding an all terrain vehicle a few months prior the incident.

On May 5, 2018, Cardona was arrested for allegedly injuring his live-in partner, Bianca Nicole Jackes, with a bladed weapon. Jackes sustained a stab wound on her left arm after being stabbed by Cardona during an argument around 5:30 AM.

PBA career statistics

Season-by-season averages

|-
| align=left | 
| align=left | Talk 'N Text
| 37 || 17.4 || .482 || .271 || .698 || 2.8 || 1.1 || .8 || .1 || 7.7
|-
| align=left | 
| align=left | Talk 'N Text
| 62 || 30.8 || .479 || .378 || .687 || 4.4 || 2.5 || .7 || .2 || 18.1
|-
| align=left | 
| align=left | Talk 'N Text
| 37 || 29.0 || .490 || .329 || .722 || 4.4 || 3.3 || .7 || .2 || 16.9
|-
| align=left | 
| align=left | Talk 'N Text
| 46 || 33.1|| .448 || .359 || .664 || 4.1 || 2.3 || 1.0 || .2 || 20.0
|-
| align=left | 
| align=left | Talk 'N Text
| 47 || 31.5 || .451 || .312 || .693 || 3.8 ||  2.9 || 1.0 || .2 || 17.1
|-
| align=left | 
| align=left | Meralco
| 24 || 35.3 || .392 || .290 || .817 || 5.0 ||  3.5 || 1.1 || .0 || 18.7
|-
| align=left | 
| align=left | Meralco
| 40 || 33.6 || .470 || .286 || .688 || 4.7 ||  2.6 || .9 || .2 || 15.8
|-
| align=left | 
| align=left | Meralco
| 43 || 27.2 || .459 || .325 || .696 || 3.6 || 1.6 || .7 || .1 || 12.1
|-
| align=left | 
| align=left | Air21
| 37 || 23.4 || .388 || .250 || .759 || 3.0 || 1.1 || .7 || .1 || 9.9
|-
| align=left | 
| align=left | NLEX
| 36 || 25.1 || .453 || .264 || .745 || 4.7 || 1.4 || .8 || .1 || 11.0
|-
| align=left | 
| align=left | NLEX
| 14|| 11.7 || .471 || .300 || .667 || 1.6 || .8 || .6 || .1 || 3.9
|-
| align=left | 
| align=left | GlobalPort Batang Pier
| 5 || 14.9 || .615 || .667 || .000 || 1.4 || .7 || .6 || .0 || 7.2
|-class=sortbottom
| align=center colspan=2 | Career
| 428 || 28.1 || .454 || .322 || .708 || 4.0 || 2.2 || .8 || .2 || 14.5

References 

1981 births
Living people
Air21 Express players
Basketball players from Metro Manila
NorthPort Batang Pier players
Maharlika Pilipinas Basketball League players
Meralco Bolts players
NLEX Road Warriors players
People from Mandaluyong
Philippine Basketball Association All-Stars
Philippines men's national basketball team players
Filipino men's basketball players
Shooting guards
TNT Tropang Giga players
De La Salle Green Archers basketball players
Barako Bull Energy draft picks
Filipino men's 3x3 basketball players
PBA 3x3 players
Zamboanga Valientes players